Jealisse Andrea Tovar Velásquez (born 3 September 1993) simply known as Andrea Tovar, is a Colombian model and beauty pageant titleholder who won Miss Colombia 2015, representing Colombia at Miss Universe 2016, where she ended up as 2nd runner-up.

Personal life
Andrea Tovar was born in Quibdó, she is the daughter of physician Antonio Tovar and Xenia Rosa Velásquez a Homemaker. She is currently studying Industrial Design and Photographic Image Production at the Jorge Tadeo Lozano University in Bogotá.

Miss Colombia 2015
She was crowned Miss Chocó in 2014, but as another contestant was selected in a different pageant to represent the same department, she had to postpone her participation in the national pageant until 2015.
She was the Miss Colombia with the longest time in holding the crown, she  was  Miss Colombia for 16 months and 4 days.
On November 16, 2015, during the final telecast Andrea was crowned Miss Colombia 2015, becoming the second  black Miss Colombia from Chocó to win the crown after Vanessa Mendoza in 2001.

Miss Universe 2016
Andrea represented Colombia at Miss Universe 2016 pageant held in the Philippines where she continued Colombia's streak in the Miss Universe pageant by placing in the semifinals for a third consecutive time finishing 2nd runner-up to Iris Mittenaere of France.

Career
Tovar was awarded as Señorita Chocó (Miss Choco Colombia 2015). She was subsequently crowned as Miss Colombia 2015. Currently she is working as a professional model.

On March 20, 2017, Tovar crowned her successor, Laura González.

Tovar has two children with her husband Julián Guillermo.

See also
 Miss Colombia 2015

References

External links

1993 births
Living people
Colombian female models
People from Quibdó
Colombian beauty pageant winners
Miss Universe 2016 contestants
Afro-Colombian women